Ryan Finnie (born 19 February 1995) is a Scottish professional footballer who plays for Spartans.

Finnie has previously played for Hamilton Academical, Dumbarton, Rangers, Partick Thistle, Annan Athletic, Alloa Athletic, Clyde, Grange Thistle, IFK Östersund, Edinburgh City, Caledonian Braves, IFK Mora, Queen's Park, Berwick Rangers, and Cowdenbeath.

Club career
Born in Law, South Lanarkshire Finnie moved on loan from Hamilton Academical to Dumbarton in January 2012. He left Hamilton in January 2014, and in March of the same year signed for Rangers on a short-term deal. He signed for Partick Thistle in January 2015, and was released by them at the end of the season.

Finnie then spent the summer of 2015 playing as a trialist for a number of different clubs, including Brechin City and Dunfermline Athletic. He eventually signed for Scottish League Two side Annan Athletic in September 2015, making his debut against Arbroath and scoring his only goal for the side in December 2015 against Montrose.

Finnie left Galabank in February 2016, signing for Scottish Championship side Alloa Athletic shortly after. Following Alloa's relegation from the Scottish Championship Finnie was released by the club, after which he subsequently re-signed for Annan. Finnie left Annan on 7 January 2017, and on 13 January 2017, joined fellow Scottish League Two side Clyde until the end of the 2016–17 season. Finnie was released by the club following the end of his contract.

After leaving Clyde, Finnie moved to Australia in June 2017, signing for Brisbane Premier League club Grange Thistle on 9 June 2017.

After a spell with Swedish club IFK Östersund, he signed for Edinburgh City in October 2018.

In January 2019 he was playing for Edusport. Finnie went back to Sweden to sign for IFK Mora in August 2019. Finnie returned to Scotland in November and signed for Queen's Park.

Finnie signed with Berwick Rangers on 7 October 2020 and  later joined Cowdenbeath on loan on 9 March 2021.

Finnie departed Berwick Rangers by mutual agreement on 27 October 2021.

Spartans announced the signing of Finnie on 18 November 2022.

International career
He was called up by the Scotland under-19 squad for the first time in April 2013.

He has played for Scotland at under-16, under-17, under-18 and under-19 level.

Career statistics

References

1995 births
Living people
Footballers from South Lanarkshire
Scottish footballers
Hamilton Academical F.C. players
Dumbarton F.C. players
Rangers F.C. players
Partick Thistle F.C. players
Annan Athletic F.C. players
Alloa Athletic F.C. players
Clyde F.C. players
Grange Thistle SC players
IFK Östersund players
F.C. Edinburgh players
Scottish Football League players
Scottish Professional Football League players
Association football fullbacks
Scotland youth international footballers
Scottish expatriate footballers
Scottish expatriate sportspeople in Australia
Expatriate soccer players in Australia
Scottish expatriate sportspeople in Sweden
Expatriate footballers in Sweden
Caledonian Braves F.C. players
IFK Mora Fotboll players
Queen's Park F.C. players
Berwick Rangers F.C. players
Cowdenbeath F.C. players
Spartans F.C. players